The Nutcracker Story is a documentary film made for The South Bank Show, written and directed by Margy Kinmonth and produced by Foxtrot Films Ltd in association with ITV productions and Channel 4 International. The film explores the cultural phenomenon that is the famous Tchaikovsky's ballet The Nutcracker, from its genesis through to the present day.

Credits 
 Contributors
 Ken Russell
 Marina Warner
 Valery Gergiev
 Anthony Holden
 Andrei Konchalovsky
 Peter Schaufuss
 Laura Morera
 Yohei Sasaki
 Peter Wright  
 Gabriela Komleva
 Matthew Bourne
 David Nixon 
 Elle Fanning
 Gerald Scarfe
 Nathan Lane
 Leonid Sarafanov
 Nadezhda Gonchar

References 

2007 films
British documentary films
2000s English-language films
2000s British films